
Gmina Jeziora Wielkie is a rural gmina (administrative district) in Mogilno County, Kuyavian-Pomeranian Voivodeship, in north-central Poland.

The gmina contains part of the protected area called Gopło Landscape Park.

Villages
Gmina Jeziora Wielkie contains the villages and settlements of Berlinek, Budy, Dobsko, Gaj, Golejewo, Jeziora Wielkie, Kościeszki, Kożuszkowo, Krzywe Kolano, Kuśnierz, Lenartowo, Lubstówek, Nowa Wieś, Nożyczyn, Pomiany, Proszyska, Przyjezierze, Radunek, Rzeszyn, Rzeszynek, Siedlimowo, Siemionki, Sierakowo, Włostowo, Wójcin, Wola Kożuszkowa, Wycinki, Wysoki Most and Żółwiny.

Neighbouring gminas
Gmina Jeziora Wielkie is bordered by the gminas of Kruszwica, Orchowo, Skulsk, Strzelno and Wilczyn.

References
Polish official population figures 2006

Jeziora Wielkie
Mogilno County